Tianxia , literally meaning "(all) under Heaven", is a Chinese term for a historical Chinese cultural concept that denoted either the entire geographical world or the metaphysical realm of mortals, and later became associated with political sovereignty. In ancient China and imperial China, tianxia denoted the lands, space, and area divinely appointed to the Chinese sovereign by universal and well-defined principles of order. The center of this land was directly apportioned to the Chinese court, forming the center of a world view that centered on the Chinese court and went concentrically outward to major and minor officials and then the common subjects, tributary states, and finally ending with fringe "barbarians".  

The center of this world view was not exclusionary in nature, and outer groups, such as ethnic minorities and foreign people, who accepted the mandate of the Chinese Emperor were themselves received and included into the Chinese tianxia. In classical Chinese political thought, the "Son of Heaven", having received the Mandate of Heaven, would nominally be the ruler of the entire world. Although in practice there would be areas of the known world which were not under the control of the Chinese monarch, in Chinese political theory the rulers of those areas derived their power from the Chinese monarch.

The larger concept of tianxia is closely associated with civilization and order in classical Chinese philosophy, and has formed the basis for the world view of the Chinese people and nations influenced by them since at least the first millennium BC. Tianxia has been applied by other realms in the Chinese cultural sphere, including Japan, Korea, and Vietnam.

Historical and political development
As reconstructed by philosopher Zhao Tingyang, tianxia presupposed "inclusion of all" and implied acceptance of the world's diversities, emphasizing harmonious reciprocal dependence and ruled by virtue as a means for lasting peace. Academic Yan Xuetong writes that in the tianxia system, rulers relied on humane authority (in contrast to tyranny and military force) to win the hearts and minds of the people. 

The tianxia world view was not fully developed during the Shang dynasty. Only during the Zhou dynasty when Heaven took on human deity traits (or at least when references to Heaven as such enter recorded history) did the concept of tianxia become common. Terms like "Four Quarters" and "Ten Thousand States" appear in texts of the time; the term "Four Quarters" means territory established by the royal court and governed by the Zhou kings from the capital, but with peripheral non-Han tribes on the outer borders and Han Chinese in the center. The term "Ten Thousand States" refers to both territory and the subjects who reside therein, both Han and "barbarian". The Zhou kings received and empowered these "Ten Thousand States" by virtue of the Mandate of Heaven. This is some of the earliest evidence of the Hua–Yi distinction.

During the Spring and Autumn and Warring States periods in the latter half of the Zhou dynasty, the power of the feudal lords developed rapidly, and several non-Han regions became powerful states themselves. As many of these feudal states had shared cultural and economic interests, the concept of a great nation centered on the Yellow River Plain gradually expanded. The term tianxia began to appear in classical texts such as the Zuo Zhuan and Guoyu.

The territory and governments of the Zhou dynasty and the Qin dynasty were unified after the conquests of Qin Shi Huang, and the concept of tianxia was adapted to act as an actual geographic entity. Qin Shi Huang's goal to "unify all under Heaven" was, in fact, representative of his desire to control and expand Chinese territory. At the founding of the Han dynasty, the equivalence of tianxia with the Chinese nation evolved due to the feudal practice of conferring land and autonomy upon the aristocracy to avoid having to expend military expense in their subjugation. Although many areas enjoyed great autonomy, the practice established and spread Chinese language and culture throughout an even wider territory.

Unification theme applied to tianxia can be seen in Sun Tzu's The Art of War where the supreme goal of offensive strategy was to conquer without destroying that which you sought to conquer:

Unified China fractured into many different dynasties during the Southern and Northern dynasties period, and with it went the practical use of the term tianxia. In the 7th century during the Tang dynasty, some northern tribes of Turkic origin, after being made vassal, referred to the Emperor Taizong as the "Khan of Heaven".

By the time of the Song dynasty, northern China was ruled by the Khitan-led Liao dynasty, the Jurchen-led Jin dynasty, and the Tangut-led Western Xia dynasty. After being threatened by these northern states and realizing the possible effects of a war to the country and people, the Song rulers invented a false concept of kinship with the Jurchens in an attempt to improve relations. The Mongol-led Yuan dynasty divided Chinese subjects into two types: those of the south, and those of the north. When the Ming dynasty overthrew the Yuan dynasty and reunited China under Han rule, the concept of tianxia returned largely as it was during the Han dynasty.

At the end of the Ming dynasty, criticisms of Neo-Confucianism and its mantras of "cultivation of moral character, establishment of family, ordering the state, and harmonizing tianxia" (a quote from the Great Learning) became widespread, producing large shifts in Confucianism. Contemporary philosopher Wang Fuzhi believed that tianxia was of a fixed, unchangeable dimension, notwithstanding the fact that the Great Learning's mentioning of "harmonizing tianxia" was actually in reference to government. Using these arguments, Wang was highly critical of Neo-Confucianism. On the other hand, the collapse of the Ming dynasty and the establishment of the Qing dynasty by the Manchus, people previously considered "fringe barbarians", heavily influenced people's views of tianxia. Gu Yanwu, a contemporary of Wang Fuzhi, wrote that the destruction of the State was not equivalent to the destruction of tianxia. He argued that the Manchus simply filled the role of Emperor, and that the tianxia of traditional Chinese culture was thus carried on.

The idea of the absolute authority of the Chinese emperor and the extension of tianxia by the assimilation of vassal states began to fade for good with George Macartney's embassy to China in 1793. George Macartney hoped to deal with China as Great Britain would with other European nations of the time, and to persuade the Emperor to reduce restrictions on trade. The Qianlong Emperor rejected his request, and stated that China was the foremost and most divine nation on Earth and had no interest in foreign goods. In the early 19th century, Britain's victory over Qing China in the First Opium War forced China to sign an unequal treaty. This marked the beginning of the end for the tianxia concept.

Following their defeat in the Second Opium War, China was forced to sign the Treaty of Tianjin, in which China was made to refer to Great Britain as a "sovereign nation", equal to itself. This made it impossible for China to continue dealing with other nations under the traditional tianxia system, and forced it to establish a foreign affairs bureau.

Because Western nations' system of international affairs was based on Westphalian sovereignty, the idea that sovereign nations deal with each other as equals, China's traditional tianxia world view slowly collapsed. After China's defeat in the First Sino-Japanese War, the Japanese terminated Korea's traditional status as a tributary state of China, and the system of feudal enfeoffment and vassalage that had been practiced since the Han dynasty came to an end, a move that greatly changed attitudes toward the tianxia concept. At the end of the 19th century, Chinese Ambassador to Great Britain Xue Fucheng took the traditional Hua-Yi distinction in the tianxia world view and replaced it with a Chinese-foreigner distinction.

Usage in the Sinosphere

Japan
References to tianxia first appear in Japanese history during the Kofun period, approximately 250 to 538 AD.  At the time, Japanese rulers were respectful and submissive to the Chinese court, and Chinese immigrants (then called toraijin ) were received happily and sought after for their knowledge of the Chinese language and culture.  The excavated Eda Funayama grave mound in Kumamoto contained an iron sword with engraved characters that dates to the late 5th century.  The characters on the sword refer to the king of the time as the "Grand King who rules all under heaven".  This discovery demonstrates that the Kofun-era Japanese (at least of that area) had begun viewing their realm to be a complete and divinely-appointed tianxia in its own right, separate from the tianxia of the older and larger Chinese empire.

According to the Book of Sui, the Yamato king in 607 sent a hand-written epistle to Emperor Yang of the Sui dynasty in which he called himself the "Son of Heaven in the Land of the Rising Sun", showing that the Japanese notion of their independent tianxia had continued to that time.

With the development of Ritsuryō in 7th-century Japan, a Sino-centric concept of tianxia was introduced and replaced older concepts.  The hallmark of Ritsuryō – the concept of citizenship – necessarily accompanied its introduction into Japan, since Neo-Confucianism said that all were "Equal Citizens Under Heaven".

In the journals of  Fujiwara no Kanezane, an official of the Kamakura shogunate whose journals became the Gyokuyō, he describes the founding of the Shogunate by Minamoto no Yoritomo as "beginning tianxia".  His usage of tianxia is entirely Ritsuryō in nature, and his phrase "beginning tianxia" refers to the establishment of a new nation, jurisprudence, and system of order.  However, even if Yoritomo had the intention to become a monarch-level ruler, Japan's tianxia concept had not achieved the Chinese level of an Emperor who governed feudal kingdoms and was entrusted with the ordering of the world by Heaven.  In the journals of Gidō Shūshin, Gidō records a discussion he had with Ashikaga Yoshimitsu where the Shōgun repeatedly referred to his dominion as "tianxia".  In the Muromachi period, people gradually began regarding the Shōgun as the representative of Heaven.

As the Muromachi shogunate weakened, regional warlords began fighting with each other for control of the nation.  More powerful nobles, such as Oda Nobunaga and Toyotomi Hideyoshi, controlled large areas and viewed their domains as tianxia.  The term was used with increasing frequency as generals sought to reunify Japan, and came to be equivalent with the land of Japan itself.

From the Sengoku to early Edo period, the shōgun or those holding the de facto power was referred to as the "Tenkanin/Tenkabito(Man under Heaven)", and the Edo Shogunate as "Court of Tianxia".  The widespread adoption of the tianxia concept helped influence Japan's long period of isolation before the Meiji Restoration.

Korea
Based on epitaphs dating to the 4th and 5th centuries, Goguryeo had concepts of Son of Heaven and independent tianxia. The rulers of Goryeo used the titles of emperor and Son of Heaven and positioned Goryeo at the center of the Haedong "East of the Sea" tianxia, which encompassed the historical domain of the "Samhan", another name for the Three Kingdoms of Korea.

In the 17th century, with the fall of the Ming dynasty in China, a concept of Korea as the cultural center of Confucianism, or the "Little China", emerged among the Confucian literati of the Joseon dynasty.

Contemporary China 
Official media frequently portrays CPC general secretary Xi Jinping as having the tianxia perspective to seek "rejuvenation of the Chinese nation and peaceful development of humanity." Under this contemporary view, China's "reemergence" as a great power presents an opportunity to reshape the Western-centric international sphere. In this contemporary discourse on tianxia, proponents argue that tianxia's moral appeal distinguishes it from realpolitick, which they submit as creating discord. Similarly, this modern treatment toward tianxia purports to be superior to the United Nations system, which is characterized as more akin to a political market, in which political operations are limited and constrained by parochial national interests.

Applying lessons from the tianxia system to a modern framework, Chinese academic Yan Xuetong argues that great powers seeking international respect must use "humane authority" instead of seeking to impose hegemony.

Western calques
The "all under the heaven" expression became the origin for the literary expressions denoting China in a number of Western languages, such as the Russian Podnebesnaya (i.e. "Under the heaven"). The English term "Celestial Empire" is said to have been based on the title of Chinese emperors, tian zi (Son of Heaven).

Other usage 
Modelled after the Chinese concept, the Singaporean historian Wang Gungwu coined the term "American Tianxia" in 2013 to refer to the contemporary world order led by the United States.

See also 

 Celestial Empire (Tian chao, "Heavenly dynasty")
 Chinese unification
Chinese exceptionalism
 Four Seas
 Huaxia
 Heaven worship
 Hero (2002 film) — a 2002 film centered on the term with controversy on the translation of tianxia to All Under Heaven versus Our Land
 Little China (ideology)
 Panarchy
 Pax Sinica ("Chinese peace")
 Son of Heaven
 The Land of Fire
 Tian (Heaven) / Shangdi (God)
 Zhao Tingyang

References

Citations

Sources 

 
 
 
 
 
 
 
 

Cultural history of China
Chinese words and phrases
Heaven
Names of China
World government
Relationship between Heaven and Mankind